The Regional Coalition for Clean Rivers and Streams (Coalition), a partnership of eight public agencies in the Portland/Vancouver metropolitan area; City of Portland, Oregon, City of Gresham, Oregon, City of Vancouver, Washington, Clean River Partners of Clackamas County, Clark County, Washington, Clean Water Services, Metro and Multnomah County, advocates on behalf of the local waterways within the territories through outreach and marketing.

History and background 
In an effort to educate the public about stormwater runoff, the Coalition for Clean Rivers and Stream (Coalition) has developed public awareness campaigns containing key messages promoting healthy stormwater management practices.

In spring 2006, the Coalition provided information about its work to students at Oregon State University (OSU) enrolled in a marketing class, titled Collaborative Processes.  The students then developed potential messages about the Coalition’s work.  The Coalition then contracted with Campbell-DeLong Resources, Inc. to conduct four focus groups, held at locations throughout the Portland metropolitan area, to assess public awareness, behavior, and attitudes regarding water runoff and the quality of area rivers and streams, as well as to test potential messages for the public awareness campaign, including previous campaign messages and those developed by the OSU students.

Areas of focus 
Pollutants such as Mercury, DDT, PCBs and PBDEs enter waterways through storm drains and other routes. 
Lawn. Over watering and rainfall can cause lawn and garden chemicals to run off into rivers, streams and lakes. This pollution can affect the health of fish and other aquatic life. Fertilizer runoff from lawns contributes to the growth of algae in lakes and streams.
Auto. Runoff from washing the car goes into storm drains and eventually into rivers, streams, creeks and wetlands.
Garden. Compost has the ability to prevent pollutants in surface runoff from reaching surface water resources.
Pets. Dog waste accounts for almost 15% of pollution in some local streams.
Home.

Water bodies 
Tualatin River
Willamette River
Columbia River
Johnson Creek
Fanno Creek
Tryon Creek
Columbia Slough
Sandy River
Clackamas River

References

External links
 Coalition for Clean Rivers and Streams
 City of Portland
 City of Gresham
 City of Vancouver
 Clean River Partners of Clackamas County
 Clark County
 Clean Water Services
 Metro
 Multnomah County

Water management authorities in the United States
Multnomah County, Oregon
Clark County, Washington
Clackamas County, Oregon
Gresham, Oregon
Local government in Oregon